Guy Madison (born Robert Ozell Moseley; January 19, 1922 – February 6, 1996) was an American film, television, and radio actor. He is best known for playing Wild Bill Hickok in the Western television series The Adventures of Wild Bill Hickok from 1951 to 1958.

During his career, Madison was given a special Golden Globe Award in 1954 and two stars (radio, television) on the Hollywood Walk of Fame in 1960.

Early life
Madison was born January 19, 1922, in Pumpkin Center, California. He attended Bakersfield College, a junior college, for two years and then worked briefly as a telephone lineman before joining the United States Navy in 1942, during World War II. He had three brothers, Wayne, Harold and David, and a sister, Rosemary. Wayne Moseley was an actor, using the stage name Wayne Mallory.

Career

David O. Selznick
In 1944, Madison was visiting Hollywood on leave when his boyish good looks and physique caught the eye of Henry Willson, the head of talent at David O. Selznick's newly formed Vanguard Pictures. Willson was widely known for his stable of good-looking young actors with unusual names that he had bestowed upon them, and he immediately rechristened Moseley as Madison and cast him in a bit part as a sailor in Selznick's Since You Went Away (1944).

Although on the screen for only three minutes, the studio received thousands of letters from fans wanting to know more about him. He received extensive coverage in the influential fan magazines of the time, including Photoplay where his agent Henry Willson had once worked.

RKO
Madison returned to military service. When he got out, Selznick assigned his contract to RKO Pictures. RKO gave him a starring role in Till the End of Time, a drama about veterans returning after World War II (1946). The film was a big hit, even though it was overshadowed by The Best Years of Our Lives (1946), another film on a similar theme. However, Madison's acting was criticized as wooden.

Madison's second starring role paired him with fellow Selznick contract player Shirley Temple in Honeymoon (1947), which was a huge flop. His career began to suffer, in part because of his limited acting ability.

Madison was borrowed by William Castle for Texas, Brooklyn & Heaven (1948). He also appeared in Massacre River (1949) and Drums in the Deep South (1951).

The Adventures of Wild Bill Hickok

Madison was eventually dropped by Selznick, along with most of Selznick's contract-players. In 1951 he was cast as the title character in the television series The Adventures of Wild Bill Hickok (1951–58), co-starring Andy Devine as his pal, Pete "Jingles" Jones. The series ran for seven years. During the run of the show,  between 1952 and 1955, sixteen feature films were released by Monogram Pictures consisting of episodes combined into a continuous story.

During the series' run, Madison also continued to make features: Red Snow (1952), a war movie for Columbia; The Charge at Feather River (1953), a Western for Fox in 3-D and a huge hit; The Command (1954), a popular Western for Warners; 5 Against the House (1955), for Columbia; The Last Frontier (1955), supporting Victor Mature; On the Threshold of Space (1955), a science fiction film for Fox; Hilda Crane (1956), a melodrama for Fox; The Beast of Hollow Mountain (1957), shot in Mexico; The Hard Man (1957), a Western; and Bullwhip (1958), another Western.

Europe
Madison went to Britain for Jet Over the Atlantic (1959) then went to Europe, where he found greater success in sword-and-sandal, spaghetti Western and macaroni combat films. He went to Italy for Slave of Rome (1961), Sword of the Conqueror (1961), Women of Devil's Island (1962), and The Executioner of Venice (1963).

Madison went to Germany for Old Shatterhand (1964) then made a spaghetti Western, Desafío en Río Bravo (1964). He did Kidnapped to Mystery Island (1964), Gentlemen of the Night (1964), The Adventurer of Tortuga (1964), Legacy of the Incas (1965), Renegade Riders (1967), and Son of Django (1967).

He made Bang Bang Kid (1967), The Devil's Man (1967), Superargo and the Faceless Giants (1968), Long Days of Hate (1968), Hell in Normandy (1968), Battle of the Last Panzer (1969), and Reverend's Colt (1970).

Personal life
Madison married the actress Gail Russell in 1949. They separated in 1953 and divorced in October 1954.

Later that month, Madison married actress Sheila Connolly in Juarez, Mexico. They had three daughters: Bridget, Erin, and Dolly. They separated in November 1960 and divorced in April 1963. He had an affair with Gia Scala and, before her death, she made him the beneficiary to her portion of the Screen Actors Pension Fund. He had a son, Robert Madison, who also became an actor.

He was a Republican who supported Dwight Eisenhower in the 1952 presidential election.

Death
Following his retirement, Madison built a large ranch home in Morongo Valley, California. He died of emphysema at the Desert Hospital Hospice in Palm Springs, California, on February 6, 1996, at the age of 74. He is buried at Forest Lawn Cemetery in Cathedral City, California. His friend, actor turned stockbroker Don Burnett, spoke at his funeral.

Recognition 
For his contribution to the radio and television industries, Madison has two stars on the Hollywood Walk of Fame. The star for his contributions to radio is located at 6933 Hollywood Boulevard; the star for his television contributions is located at 6333 Hollywood Boulevard

In 1996, a Golden Palm Star was dedicated to Madison on the Palm Springs Walk of Stars, in Palm Springs, California.

Filmography

Awards

References

Further reading
 Wise, James. Stars in Blue: Movie Actors in America's Sea Services. Annapolis, Maryland: Naval Institute Press, 1997. . .

External links
 
 
 Guy Madison at Brian's Drive-in Theater

1922 births
1996 deaths
20th-century American male actors
American male film actors
Film producers from California
United States Navy personnel of World War II
American male radio actors
American male television actors
Western (genre) television actors
Bakersfield College alumni
Burials at Forest Lawn Cemetery (Cathedral City)
Deaths from emphysema
Male actors from Bakersfield, California
Male Spaghetti Western actors
RKO Pictures contract players
20th-century American businesspeople
California Republicans